Mohammad Nuruzzaman is a Jatiya Party (Ershad) politician and the former Member of Parliament of Kishoreganj-2.

Career
Nuruzzaman was elected to parliament from Kishoreganj-2 as a Jatiya Party candidate in 1986 and 1988.

References

Jatiya Party politicians
Living people
3rd Jatiya Sangsad members
4th Jatiya Sangsad members
Year of birth missing (living people)